Musica was a South African-based music and film retailer. The first Musica-branded store was opened in 1992 and later in the same year was bought by Clicks Group for R1.2 million in 1992.   

In 2006, under pressure to change its business model due to the growth of online music purchases, the company expanded its range of products to film, video games, electronic accessories, branded clothing merchandise and books.  In 2015 Clicks reported that its Musica brand did around R1 billion in turnover with that turnover declining by between 10% to 15% every year thereafter until its closure. The 2020 COVID pandemic and resulting lockdown was reported as the final cause of its closure. 

On January 30, 2021, the company announced that it would be closing all its remaining 59 branches by the end of May 2021. However on May 26, 2021, the chain shut down the last remaining stores a few days before the expected date.

References 

1992 establishments in South Africa
Retail companies established in 1992
Defunct companies of South Africa
Music retailers of the United Kingdom
Retail companies of South Africa
Video game retailers